The 2014 U.S. National Indoor Tennis Championships was a 2014 ATP World Tour men's tennis tournament, played on indoor hard courts. The tournament from this year was downgraded from ATP World Tour 500 series to ATP World Tour 250 series. It was the 39th edition of the first American tournament of the year and took place at the Racquet Club of Memphis in Memphis, United States, from February 11 through February 17, 2014. First-seeded Kei Nishikori won the singles title.

Singles main-draw entrants

Seeds

1 Rankings as of February 3, 2014

Other entrants
The following players received wildcards into the singles main draw:
  Marcos Baghdatis
  Nick Kyrgios
  Kei Nishikori

The following player received entry as a special exempt:
  Björn Phau

The following players received entry from the qualifying draw:
  David Goffin
  Denis Kudla
  Alex Kuznetsov
  Rajeev Ram

Withdrawals
Before the tournament
  Vasek Pospisil (back injury)
  Dudi Sela
  Janko Tipsarević

Retirements
  Lu Yen-hsun (neck pain)

ATP doubles main-draw entrants

Seeds

1 Rankings as of February 3, 2014

Other entrants
The following pairs received wildcards into the doubles main draw:
  Ryan Harrison /  Sam Querrey
  David O'Hare /  Joe Salisbury
The following pair received entry as alternates:
  Adrian Mannarino /  Michael Russell

Withdrawals
Before the tournament
  Michał Przysiężny (back injury)

Finals

Singles 

  Kei Nishikori defeated  Ivo Karlović, 6–4, 7–6(7–0)

Doubles 

  Eric Butorac /  Raven Klaasen defeated  Bob Bryan /  Mike Bryan, 6–4, 6–4

References

External links 
 

U.S. National Indoor Tennis Championships
U.S. National Indoor Tennis Championships
U.S. National Indoor Championships
U.S. National Indoor Tennis Championships